Joanna (also ), the wife of Chuza, is a woman mentioned in the gospels who was healed by Jesus and later supported him and his disciples in their travels. She is one of the women recorded in the Gospel of Luke as accompanying Jesus and the twelve apostles and as a witness to Jesus' resurrection. Her husband was Chuza, who managed the household of Herod Antipas, the ruler of Galilee; this is the origin of the distinguishing epithet commonly attached to her name, differentiating her from other figures named Joanna or Joanne.  

She is recognised as a saint in the Anglican, Eastern Orthodox, and Catholic traditions.

Joanna in the Gospels

In Luke 24:10, Joanna is mentioned by name, along with Mary Magdalene and Mary of Clopas, as among the women who took spices to Jesus' tomb and found the stone rolled away and the tomb empty. The accounts in the other synoptic gospels do not mention Joanna as one of the group of women who observe Jesus' burial and testify to his Resurrection.

Holy Myrrhbearer traditions

In Orthodox tradition, she is honored as "Saint Joanna the Myrrhbearer" and is commemorated among the eight women who carried myrrh on the "Sunday of the Myrrhbearers", two Sundays after Pascha (Orthodox Easter). From this commemoration, in the revised Calendar of Saints of the Lutheran Church–Missouri Synod she is commemorated as one of the Holy Myrrhbearers on August 3, together with other women present at the tomb of Jesus in New Testament accounts. These include Mary of Clopas (also called Mary, the mother of James the Less and Joses) and Salome.

Although not mentioned by name, Joanna is seen as one of the women who joined the disciples and Mary, mother of Jesus, in the upper room in prayer. She was believed to be among the group of 120 who chose Matthias the Apostle to fill the vacancy that was left by Judas, as well as being present on the Day of Pentecost.

Identification with Junia

Richard Bauckham argues for identifying Joanna, the wife of Chuza, with the Junia mentioned in Paul's letter to the Romans 16:7, "Joanna" being her Jewish name, and "Junia" her Roman. Joanna is mentioned as one of the members of the ministry of Jesus in the Gospel of Luke, travelling with him among the other twelve and some other women, city to city.

Joanna is also mentioned alongside Mary Magdalene and other women as those who first visited the tomb and found it to be empty, and it is to this group of women, including Joanna, that Jesus first appears and instructs to tell the disciples to meet him in Galilee in Matthew 28:8-10. Bauckham notes that Paul describes Junia as having been a member of the Christian community prior to him, and given that Paul himself converted within three years of the death of Jesus, that would require Junia to have been a member of the community from a very early period. Whereas Joanna is a Hellenized, Grecian, adaptation of a Hebrew name, Junia is a Latin name. Jews often adopted a second, Latin name that were nearly sound equivalents to their original name. Joanna and Junia act as near sound equivalents in the native languages, which Bauckham says is indicative of the identification between the two. Finally, Paul describes Junia as being "prominent among the apostles". Given that Junia is described as an earliest member of the community, and as one of the most prominent members, that she is not named elsewhere is indicative, as Bauckham argues, that she and Joanna are the same individual, given Joanna's high prominence during the ministry of Jesus.

In popular culture
 In the 2015 television miniseries Killing Jesus Rotem Zissman-Cohen plays Joanna. 
 In the 2015 television miniseries A.D. The Bible Continues, Joanna is portrayed by Farzana Dua Elahe.
 Joanna is a fictional character in The Lost Wisdom of the Magi
 In the third season of the 2017 television series The Chosen Joanna is portrayed by Amy Bailey. She is deeply moved by the Sermon on the Mount and helps Andrew meet the imprisoned John the Baptizer.

See also
 Women in the Bible
 List of Christian women of the patristic age

Notes

References

Sources

Further reading
 
  Archived PDF

External links
 Character Study of Joanna
 Icon of St. Joanna the Myrrh-Bearer

Followers of Jesus
Saints from the Holy Land
Christian saints from the New Testament
1st-century Christian female saints
Gospel of Luke
Women in the New Testament
Angelic visionaries
Myrrhbearers